Blackletter (sometimes black letter), also known as Gothic script, Gothic minuscule, or Textura, was a script used throughout Western Europe from approximately 1150 until the 17th century. It continued to be commonly used for the Danish, Norwegian, and Swedish languages until the 1870s, and for the German language until the 1940s, when Hitler's distaste for the supposedly "Jewish-influenced" script saw it officially discontinued in 1941. Fraktur is a notable script of this type, and sometimes the entire group of blackletter faces is incorrectly referred to as Fraktur. Blackletter is sometimes referred to as Old English, but it is not to be confused with the Old English language, which predates blackletter by many centuries and was written in the insular script or in Futhorc. Along with Italic type and Roman type, blackletter served as one of the major typefaces in the history of Western typography.

Origins

Carolingian minuscule was the direct ancestor of blackletter. Blackletter developed from Carolingian as an increasingly literate 12th-century Europe required new books in many different subjects. New universities were founded, each producing books for business, law, grammar, history and other pursuits, not solely religious works, for which earlier scripts typically had been used.

These books needed to be produced quickly to keep up with demand. Labor-intensive Carolingian, though legible, was unable to effectively keep up. Its large size consumed a lot of manuscript space in a time when writing materials were very costly. As early as the 11th century, different forms of Carolingian were already being used, and by the mid-12th century, a clearly distinguishable form, able to be written more quickly to meet the demand for new books, was being used in northeastern France and the Low Countries.

Etymology

The term Gothic was first used to describe this script in 15th-century Italy, in the midst of the Renaissance, because Renaissance humanists believed this style was barbaric, and Gothic was a synonym for barbaric. Flavio Biondo, in Italia Illustrata (1474), wrote that the Germanic Lombards invented this script after they invaded Italy in the 6th century.

Not only were blackletter forms called Gothic script, but any other seemingly barbarian script, such as Visigothic, Beneventan, and Merovingian, were also labeled Gothic. This in contrast to Carolingian minuscule, a highly legible script which the humanists called littera antiqua ("the ancient letter"), wrongly believing that it was the script used by the ancient Romans. It was in fact invented in the reign of Charlemagne, although only used significantly after that era, and actually formed the basis for the later development of blackletter.

Blackletter script should not be confused with either the ancient alphabet of the Gothic language nor with the sans-serif typefaces that are also sometimes called Gothic.

Forms

Textura
Textualis, also known as textura or Gothic bookhand, was the most calligraphic form of blackletter, and today is the form most associated with "Gothic". Johannes Gutenberg carved a textualis typeface – including a large number of ligatures and common abbreviations – when he printed his 42-line Bible. However, textualis was rarely used for typefaces after this.

According to Dutch scholar Gerard Lieftinck, the pinnacle of blackletter use was reached in the 14th and 15th centuries. For Lieftinck, the highest form of textualis was littera textualis formata, used for de luxe manuscripts. The usual form, simply littera textualis, was used for literary works and university texts. Lieftinck's third form, littera textualis currens, was the cursive form of blackletter, extremely difficult to read and used for textual glosses, and less important books.

Textualis was most widely used in France, the Low Countries, England, and Germany. Some characteristics of the script are:
Tall, narrow letters, as compared to their Carolingian counterparts.
Letters formed by sharp, straight, angular lines, unlike the typically round Carolingian; as a result, there is a high degree of "breaking", i.e. lines that do not necessarily connect with each other, especially in curved letters.
A related characteristic is the half r (also called r rotunda), the shape of  when attached to other letters with bows; only the bow and tail were written, connected to the bow of the previous letter. In other scripts, this only occurred in a ligature with the letter .
Similarly related is the form of the letter  when followed by a letter with a bow; its ascender is then curved to the left, like the uncial . Otherwise the ascender is vertical.
The letter a has a straight back stroke, and the top loop eventually became closed, somewhat resembling the number .
Minims, especially in the later period of the script, do not connect with each other. A 14th-century example of the difficulty minims produced is: mimi numinum niuium minimi munium nimium uini muniminum imminui uiui minimum uolunt ('the smallest mimes of the gods of snow do not wish at all in their life that the great duty of the defenses of wine be diminished'). In blackletter, this would look like a series of single strokes. As a result, dotted  and the letter  were subsequently developed. Minims may also have finals of their own.
The script has many more scribal abbreviations than Carolingian, adding to the speed in which it could be written.

Schwabacher

Schwabacher was a blackletter form that was much used in early German print typefaces. It continued to be used occasionally until the 20th century. Characteristics of Schwabacher are:

The small letter  is rounded on both sides, though at the top and at the bottom, the two strokes join in an angle. Other small letters have analogous forms.
The small letter  has a horizontal stroke at its top that forms crosses with the two downward strokes.
The capital letter  has a peculiar form somewhat reminiscent of the small letter .

Fraktur

Fraktur is a form of blackletter that became the most common German blackletter typeface by the mid-16th century. Its use was so common that often any blackletter form is called Fraktur in Germany. Characteristics of Fraktur are:

The left side of the small letter  is formed by an angular stroke, the right side by a rounded stroke. At the top and at the bottom, both strokes join in an angle. Other small letters have analogous forms.
The capital letters are compound of rounded -shaped or -shaped strokes.

Here is the entire alphabet in Fraktur (minus the long s and the sharp s ), using the AMS Euler Fraktur typeface:

Cursiva
Cursiva refers to a very large variety of forms of blackletter; as with modern cursive writing, there is no real standard form. It developed in the 14th century as a simplified form of textualis, with influence from the form of textualis as used for writing charters. Cursiva developed partly because of the introduction of paper, which was smoother than parchment. It was therefore, easier to write quickly on paper in a cursive script.

However, not all of these features are found in every example of cursiva, which makes it difficult to determine whether or not a script may be called cursiva at all.

Lieftinck also divided cursiva into three styles: littera cursiva formata was the most legible and calligraphic style. Littera cursiva textualis (or libraria) was the usual form, used for writing standard books, and it generally was written with a larger pen, leading to larger letters. Littera cursiva currens was used for textbooks and other unimportant books and it had very little standardization in forms.

Hybrida
Hybrida is also called bastarda (especially in France), and as its name suggests, is a hybrid form of the script. It is a mixture of textualis and cursiva, developed in the early 15th century.

Donatus-Kalender
The Donatus-Kalender (also known as Donatus-und-Kalender or D-K) is the name for the metal type design that Gutenberg used in his earliest surviving printed works, dating from the early 1450s. The name is taken from two works: the Ars grammatica of Aelius Donatus, a Latin grammar, and the Kalender (calendar). It is a form of textura.

Blackletter typesetting
While an antiqua typeface is usually a compound of roman types and italic types since the 16th-century French typographers, the blackletter typefaces never developed a similar distinction. Instead, they use letterspacing (German Sperrung) for emphasis. The use of bold text for emphasis is also alien to blackletter typefaces.

Words from other languages, especially from Romance languages including Latin, are usually typeset in antiqua instead of blackletter. Like that, single antiqua words or phrases may occur within a blackletter text. This does not apply, however, to loanwords that have been incorporated into the language.

National forms

England

Textualis

English blackletter developed from the form of Carolingian minuscule used there after the Norman Conquest, sometimes called "Romanesque minuscule". Textualis forms developed after 1190 and were used most often until approximately 1300, after which it became used mainly for de luxe manuscripts. English forms of blackletter have been studied extensively and may be divided into many categories. Textualis formata ("Old English" or "blackletter"), textualis prescissa (or textualis sine pedibus, as it generally lacks feet on its minims), textualis quadrata (or psalterialis) and semi-quadrata, and textualis rotunda are various forms of high-grade formata styles of blackletter.

The University of Oxford borrowed the littera parisiensis in the 13th century and early 14th century, and the littera oxoniensis form is almost indistinguishable from its Parisian counterpart; however, there are a few differences, such as the round final  forms, resembling the number , rather than the long  used in the final position in the Paris script.

 
Printers of the late 15th and early 16th centuries commonly used blackletter typefaces, but under the influence of Renaissance tastes, Roman typefaces grew in popularity, until by about 1590 most presses had converted to them. However, blackletter was considered to be more readily legible (especially by the less literate classes of society), and it therefore remained in use throughout the 17th century and into the 18th for documents intended for widespread dissemination, such as proclamations and Acts of Parliament, and for literature aimed at the common people, such as ballads, chivalric romances, and jokebooks.

Chaucer's works had been printed in blackletter in the late 15th century, but were subsequently more usually printed in Roman type. Horace Walpole wrote in 1781 that "I am too, though a Goth, so modern a Goth that I hate the black letter, and I love Chaucer better in Dryden and Baskerville than in his own language and dress."

Cursiva
English cursiva began to be used in the 13th century, and soon replaced littera oxoniensis as the standard university script. The earliest cursive blackletter form is Anglicana, a very round and looped script, which also had a squarer and angular counterpart, Anglicana formata. The formata form was used until the 15th century and also was used to write vernacular texts. An Anglicana bastarda form developed from a mixture of Anglicana and textualis, but by the 16th century, the principal cursive blackletter used in England was the Secretary script, which originated in Italy and came to England by way of France.

France

Textualis
French textualis was tall and narrow compared to other national forms, and was most fully developed in the late 13th century in Paris. In the 13th century there also was an extremely small version of textualis used to write miniature Bibles, known as "pearl script". Another form of French textualis in this century was the script developed at the University of Paris, littera parisiensis, which also is small in size and designed to be written quickly, not calligraphically.

Cursiva
French cursiva was used from the 13th to the 16th century, when it became highly looped, messy, and slanted. Bastarda, the "hybrid" mixture of cursiva and textualis, developed in the 15th century and was used for vernacular texts as well as Latin. A more angular form of bastarda was used in Burgundy, the lettre de forme or lettre bourgouignonne, for books of hours such as the Très Riches Heures of John, Duke of Berry.

Germany

Despite the frequent association of blackletter with German, the script was actually very slow to develop in German-speaking areas. It developed first in those areas closest to France and then spread to the east and south in the 13th century. The German-speaking areas are, however, where blackletter remained in use the longest.

Schwabacher typefaces dominated in Germany from about 1480 to 1530, and the style continued in use occasionally until the 20th century. Most importantly, all of the works of Martin Luther, leading to the Protestant Reformation, as well as the Apocalypse of Albrecht Dürer (1498), used this typeface. Johann Bämler, a printer from Augsburg, probably first used it as early as 1472. The origins of the name remain unclear; some assume that a typeface-carver from the village of Schwabach—one who worked externally and who thus became known as the Schwabacher—designed the typeface.

Textualis
German Textualis is usually very heavy and angular, and there are few characteristic features that are common to all occurrences of the script. Textualis was first used in the 13th and 14th centuries, and subsequently become more elaborate and decorated, as well as being reserved used for liturgical works only.

Johann Gutenberg used a textualis typeface for his famous Gutenberg Bible in 1455. Schwabacher, a blackletter with more rounded letters, soon became the usual printed typeface, but it was replaced by Fraktur in the early 17th century.

Fraktur came into use when Emperor Maximilian I (1493–1519) established a series of books and had a new typeface created specifically for this purpose. In the 19th century, the use of antiqua alongside Fraktur increased, leading to the Antiqua-Fraktur dispute, which lasted until the Nazis abandoned Fraktur in 1941. Since it was so common, all kinds of blackletter tend to be called Fraktur in German.

Cursiva

A hybrida form, which was basically cursiva with fewer looped letters and with similar square proportions as textualis, was used in the 15th and 16th centuries.

In the 18th century, the pointed quill was adopted for blackletter handwriting. In the early 20th century, the Sütterlin script was introduced in the schools.

Italy

Rotunda

Italian blackletter also is known as rotunda, as it was less angular than those produced by northern printing centers. The most common form of Italian rotunda was littera bononiensis, used at the University of Bologna in the 13th century. Biting is a common feature in rotunda, but breaking is not.

Cursiva
Italian cursive developed in the 13th century from scripts used by notaries. The more calligraphic form is known as minuscola cancelleresca italiana (or simply cancelleresca, chancery hand), which developed into a book hand, a script used for writing books rather than charters, in the 14th century. Cancelleresca influenced the development of bastarda in France and secretary hand in England.

The Netherlands

Textualis
A textualis form, commonly known as Gotisch or "Gothic script", was used for general publications from the fifteenth century on, but became restricted to official documents and religious publications during the seventeenth century. Its use persisted into the nineteenth century for editions of the State Translation of the Bible, but otherwise became obsolete.

Unicode
Mathematical blackletter characters are separately encoded in Unicode in the Mathematical alphanumeric symbols range at U+1D504-1D537 and U+1D56C-1D59F (bold), except for individual letters already encoded in the Letterlike Symbols range (plus long s at U+017F).  Fonts supporting the range include Code2001, Cambria Math, and Quivira (textura style).

This block of characters is intended for use in setting mathematical texts, which contrast blackletter characters with other letter styles. Outside of mathematics, the character set has seen some limited decorative use, but it lacks punctuation and other characters necessary for running text, and the Unicode standard for setting non-mathematical material in blackletter is to use ordinary Latin code points with a dedicated blackletter font.

Mathematical Fraktur:

Mathematical Bold Fraktur:

See also

Antiqua (typeface class)
Asemic writing
Bastarda
Book hand
Calligraphy
Chancery hand
Court hand (also known as common law hand, Anglicana, cursiva antiquior, or charter hand)
Cursive
Hand (writing style)
Handwriting
History of writing
Italic script
Law hand
Paleography
Penmanship
Ronde script (calligraphy)
Rotunda (script)
Round hand
Secretary hand

References

Further reading
 Bernhard Bischoff, Latin Palaeography: Antiquity and the Middle Ages, Cambridge University Press, 1989.

External links

 'Manual of Latin Palaeography' (A comprehensive PDF file containing 82 pages profusely illustrated, June 2014).
 Learn Blackletter Online
 Association for the German Script and Language
 Pfeffer Simpelgotisch A simple OpenType blackletter font setting ſ and s by itself
 London Review of Books article about blackletter fonts and font history in general

 
Medieval scripts
Palaeography
Typography
Western calligraphy